Panchlora nivea, the Cuban cockroach or green banana cockroach, is a small species of cockroach found in Cuba and the Caribbean, and along the Gulf Coast from Florida to Texas, and has been observed as far north as Summerville, South Carolina. It is found in subtropical or tropical climates.

The females can grow up to 24 mm and the smaller males are 12 to 15 mm long.  It is winged and a strong flier, pale green to yellowish green in color, with a yellow line running up the sides.  The nymphs  are brown or black in color and are burrowers.

It is usually an outdoor species and is rarely found indoors, so is not considered a pest. The adults can often be found in shrubbery, trees, and plants. The young can be found under logs and other debris.  It is often attracted to both indoor and outdoor lights and it is mainly a nocturnal species.

It is often a popular pet roach due to its relatively pleasant green color, and because it is not an invasive indoor species. It is also used as food for other pets.

A study found that they contained 28 to 60 eggs (average 46). The ootheca is carried internally by the female until the eggs hatch. At  the eggs hatch in about 48 days, after which male nymphs mature in about 144 days, and female nymphs mature in about 181 days.

References

External links
 Close-up photography of the Green banana cockroach under CC-BY-SA
 Black and white photographs from showing top and underside views, including a specimen with red areas characteristic of Serratia marcescens infection.

Cockroaches
Insects described in 1758
Taxa named by Carl Linnaeus